Lawrie Brewster is a Scottish indie filmmaker, director and producer, known for his 2013 film Lord of Tears, which won the Audience Award at the 2013 Bram Stoker International Film Festival.  He is also the director of Hex Media, a horror film production company that he runs with writer Sarah Daly, with whom he frequently collaborates, as well as technicians Michael Brewster and Tom Staunton.

In 2014 Brewster began filming The Unkindness of Ravens, which was written by Daly and stars Jamie Scott Gordon, who co-starred in Lord of Tears. The film moved into post-production during 2015 and Brewster launched a Kickstarter campaign to help with costs. Brewster also frequently works with actress Alexandra Hulme, with whom he began working in 2010 on the Morgan M. Morgansen short films.

Filmography

References

External links
 

Scottish film producers
Scottish film directors
Horror film directors
Living people
Year of birth missing (living people)